The following tables indicate the states that are party to the various Hague Conventions of 1899 and 1907. If a state has ratified, acceded, or succeeded to one of the treaties, the year of the original ratification is indicated. An "S" indicates that a state has signed but not yet ratified a particular treaty, and a "–" indicates that the state has taken no action with respect to the treaty.  Italicised states have ceased to exist with no legal successor.  Dates which have been struck and have a "(W)" are ratifications that have been subsequently withdrawn.

1899 Hague Conventions and Declarations

1907 Hague Conventions

Notes

References

External links
Hague Peace Conventions 1899, Netherlands Ministry of Foreign Affairs (official depository)
Hague Peace Conventions 1907, Netherlands Ministry of Foreign Affairs (official depository)
"Treaties and State Parties to Such Treaties", icrc.org

Hague Conventions of 1899 and 1907
List